Feđa Stojanović (31 January 1948 – 5 May 2021) was a Serbian actor. He appeared in more than eighty films since 1962.

In 2017, Feđa Stojanović signed the Declaration on the Common Language of the Croats, Serbs, Bosniaks and Montenegrins.

Selected filmography

References

External links 

1948 births
2021 deaths
People from Aleksinac
Serbian male film actors
Signatories of the Declaration on the Common Language